The Rwanda national rugby union team represents Rwanda in international rugby union. Rwanda are an associate member of the International Rugby Board (IRB), and have yet to play in a Rugby World Cup qualifying tournament.

The Rwanda national team made their international debut in a match against Zambia in 2003, lost by 9-107, for the CAR Division 2. They won their subsequent international against Burundi by 18-5.

Record

Overall

External links
 Rwandan Rugby Federation Website
 Friends of Rwanda Rugby.org
 Rwanda at IRB Official Site
 Rwanda On rugbydata.com

African national rugby union teams
Rugby union in Rwanda
2003 establishments in Rwanda